The Kontinental Hockey League (KHL) Conference Finals are the Eastern Conference and Western Conference Championship series of the KHL. The Conference Finals are best-of-seven series. The two series are played after the first and second rounds of the playoffs and before the Gagarin Cup Finals. The final two teams in the Eastern Conference and Western Conference face off. The series are the conference equivalents of the Gagarin Cup Finals. The conferences were established during the second season of competition. In the inaugural season there were no conferences, only four divisions. The respective winners of the Eastern and Western Conference Finals receive the Eastern Conference winner cup and Western Conference winner cup.().

Eastern Conference

Western Conference

References

External links
 , official Eastern Conference final 2010 match 6 gallery, photo of Aleksey Morozov receiving the Eastern Conference winner cup
 , official Eastern Conference final 2010 match 6 gallery, photo of Ak Bars Kazan team members with the Eastern Conference winner cup
 , official Western Conference final 2010 match 7 gallery, photo of Vladimir Gorbunov receiving the Western Conference winner cup
 , official Western Conference final 2010 match 7 gallery, photo of Martin Štrbák and Filip Novák with the Western Conference winner cup

Kontinental Hockey League